Artur Lopes dos Santos (born 27 March 1931) is a retired Portuguese footballer who played as defender.

Honours
Benfica
 Primeira Liga: 1954–55, 1956–57, 1959–60, 1960–61

References

External links
 
 

1931 births
Living people
Portuguese footballers
Association football forwards
Primeira Liga players
S.L. Benfica footballers
Portugal international footballers
Portuguese football managers
S.C. Olhanense managers
U.F.C.I. Tomar managers
Atlético Clube de Portugal managers
G.C. Alcobaça managers
Juventude Sport Clube managers
S.C. Farense managers